One More Girl was a Canadian country music duo composed of actress-singers Carly and Britt McKillip, who are sisters. The duo signed to EMI Canada in 2008 and released their debut album, Big Sky, in 2009. In 2010, they won the Rising Star award at the Canadian Country Music Association Awards. In August 2011, the duo signed with American pop music label Interscope Records.

Biography
In December 2008, One More Girl signed with EMI Music Canada and released their debut single, "I Can Love Anyone", to Canadian country radio shortly after. EMI released the duo's debut album, Big Sky, on October 6, 2009. Another single for EMI, "Fall Like That", was released in early 2011 as the first single from the duo's second album.

In August 2011, the duo signed with Interscope Records, an American pop music label.

The duo released an extended play, The Hard Way, in February 2014 via Open Road Recordings.

Both sisters are also actresses, with Carly known for her role in the series Alice, I Think, while Britt is known for co-starring in the US cable TV series Dead Like Me and also providing the voice of Princess Cadance for My Little Pony: Friendship is Magic. By 2023, the group had already disbanded.

Discography

Albums

Extended plays

Singles

Music videos

Awards and nominations

Canadian Country Music Association Awards

Other awards
2005-2007 B.C. Country Music Association "Group of the Year"- 3 Nominations
2009 B.C. Country Music Association "Horizon Award"
2010 Canadian Radio Music "Best New Country Artist"
2010 B.C. Country Music Association "Single of the Year", "Group or Duo", "Album of the Year", "Entertainer of the Year"

References

External links

Canadian country music groups
Country music duos
Sibling musical duos
Interscope Records artists
Open Road Recordings artists
Canadian musical duos
Musical groups established in 2008
Musical groups disestablished in 2015
Canadian Country Music Association Rising Star Award winners
Female musical duos